Juli Lynne Charlot (born October 26, 1922) is an American singer, actress and fashion designer. She is the creator of the poodle skirt.

Early life
Born Shirley Ann Agin on October 26, 1922 in the Bronx, New York, United States, Charlot began her singing career at an early age.

She moved to Los Angeles as a young girl and quickly found success as a singer, which was followed by acting roles in plays and movies.

Career

Singer
She sang with Xavier Cugat’s orchestra and later with the Los Angeles Civic Light Opera Company.

Actor

Before long, she found herself in the company of the Marx Brothers, who asked Charlot to play a stooge in their Marx Brothers act while performing at military bases during World War II.Charlot invented the poodle skirt in 1947.

The attractive young woman found herself caught up in a whirlwind of offers from a great variety of acts and she begin traveling the world in the company of some of the greatest names in show business at the time.

Charlot appeared in the 1945 Broadway revival of Victor Herbert’s The Red Mill, along with Michael O'Shea, Eddie Foy Jr., Eddie Dew and Charles Collins (actor).

The Red Mill is an operetta written by Victor Herbert. It premiered on Broadway on September 24, 1906 at the Knickerbocker Theatre (Broadway) and ran for 274 performances. It was revived on October 16, 1945, opening at the Ziegfeld Theatre, and running for 531 performances. The show also had a London run and toured extensively.

This led to a casting as a singer in Night in Paradise, a 1946 American film produced by Walter Wanger and directed by Arthur Lubin. The movie, produced by Universal Studios starred the Anglo-Indian star Merle Oberon, Gale Sondergaard, Turhan Bey, Thomas Gomez, Jerome Cowan, George Dolenz (the father of actor Micky Dolenz), John Litel, and many others.

For Night in Paradise, Charlot performed the title song in a lovely festive palace sequence in the film.

Fashion designer
As a performer, Charlot had strong ideas about how she wanted to look.  She designed her stage wardrobe even though she could not sew.  She hired a professional dressmaker to bring her designs to life.

As the war came to a close, Charlot met and married film editor Philip Charlot. She gave up performing to be a post-war wife.  In 1947 two seemingly unrelated events came together to start her career in fashion.  First, fashion changed dramatically with the New Look.  World War II fabric restrictions were lifted and hemlines dropped and skirts got full.

About the same time, Philip Charlot lost his job. Juli Lynne was a young woman who wanted to be in fashion but she had no money for the new styles. In 1947, at the age of 25, Charlot was invited to a holiday party in Los Angeles and wanted to create a dress especially for the event. Not having money at the time Charlot decided to make her own skirt for the Christmas party.  Charlot stated in a United Press International article of February 25, 1953 that, "If I had known how to sew, or had the money to purchase better materials, I would have never made the circle skirt." Fortunately, Charlot's mother owned a factory which used felt and thus she had a free supply of that material. She states that, "I cut the circle out of felt, which allowed me to cut a complete circle skirt without having any seams. I added some whimsical Christmas motif appliqués and the result was so attractive that she received many compliments at the party.

A week later, still in need of money, Charlot decided to duplicate the effort by making two more circle skirts took them to a Beverly Hills, California boutique just prior to Christmas 1947. The owner was excited and quickly put them on the floor where they sold immediately. The store owner called her to place another order and thus the Juli Lynne Charlot California company was started. There was a big demand for the whimsical felt designs and life seemed rosy for a while. Charlot tells the story of how she, "saved up a little money and opened my own factory, and then boom - I was in a mess. I couldn't do arithmetic. Mother hocked her diamond ring three weeks in a row to help me meet the payroll." A New York City dress manufacturer dropped in one day to find the then 26-year-old Charlot in tears and the business almost submerged by bills. His firm decided to invest some money in the factory. "That was a blessing," Charlot said, "it allowed me to hire a secretary who was much better at math than I was at the time." By 1953, the business was well on its way to a great success and the dresses were being sold in hundreds of stores nationwide. The line continued with felt dresses in the winter and added poplin dresses in the summer months. Huge felt roses, realistic yellow daffodils, water lilies complete with a discreet frog and various whimsical story patterns were attached to the skirts using an appliqué process.

In terms of 1950s clothing, the image that most often pops into mind is the poodle skirt. Most vintage collectors know Charlot as the designer of some of the very best and most clever circle skirts to come out of the 1950s. After Christmas 1947 the Los Angeles boutique requested a non-holiday design.  It was quite fashionable at the time for women to be accompanied by dogs on leashes and thus Charlot decided to make a dog-themed skirt. As always, her designs told a story and the dog skirt was no different. Charlot came up with the idea of three Dachshunds: two females and a male.  The first dog was a flirty girl, the second was a girl with her nose stuck in the air, and the third was the male who was trying to get to the flirty girl.  But all the leashes became intertwined so the male dog could only get to the stuck up female. 
The boutique loved the skirt and they sold well, and in early 1948, Charlot designed a similar one with poodles, which proved to become more widely successful than the dachshunds. And thus the iconic poodle skirt was born. Within a short time the president of Bullocks Wilshire in Los Angeles called Charlot.  He had seen the poodle skirts and he wanted her to do similar designs for Bullocks Wilshire.  Not only that, he gave her the windows on Wilshire Boulevard to decorate with her skirts.  She did a series of six designs for the windows.

Before long, Charlot had orders from all over the country – Stanley Marcus at Neiman Marcus in Dallas, Texas and Andrew Goodman at Bergdorf Goodman were early customers.  By the time Charlot was 24, she had a clothing factory and 50 employees.  She decided it was time to learn to sew and so she started design school.  She was so busy that she didn’t have time for the classes, so she quit, and then hired her sewing teacher.  She learned how to sew on the job from this teacher turned employee.

Charlot's creations were more than clothing - they told a story - and became conversation starters. She made sure that the stores buying her clothes knew the stories behind the skirts so they could tell them to the customers.  Juli Lynne Charlot designs were so successful that one of them appeared in a national ad campaign for Maidenform bras in 1952. Part of Maidenform’s famous and iconic “I Dreamed…” ad campaign, this 1952 ad shows a Lynne Charlot race horse themed circle skirt on a model who has dreamed she was at the races. The original Juli Lynne Charlot Horse Racing Circle Skirt sold a few years ago for $665 by AntiqueDress.com. Another skirt with a playing card motif recently sold for $585.

To go with her skirts, Charlot made matching bustiers, stoles, boleros, Halternecks and sweaters, and there were hats and handbags decorated to match the clothes.  The factory also did custom work, as it did for Madeleine Haskell, magician’s assistant.  In 1952, Leading Designer Patterns, a mail order pattern company, released one of her designs.

Although she is best known for her wonderful full skirts, Charlot has had other clothing enterprises.  Her last design venture started with a trip to Mexico in 1980. While in Mexico, Charlot fell in love with the classic Mexican wedding dress.  She decided to do up-dated variations on this dress, bought a manufacturing plant in Mexico City to produce them and began exporting the dresses around the world. Everything went well until the 1985 Mexico City earthquake. Her factory collapsed, and though she tried getting her dresses made in New York, it was too expensive and so the business was lost.

However, having fallen in love with Mexico, Charlot decided to retire in Mexico and purchased the home of her dreams in Tepoztlán, just outside Cuernavaca, Mexico. Charlot often bursts into song with a wonderful soprano voice that is still strong. She regales visitors with her wonderful stories of the movies and the Broadway plays she has appeared in, her adventures singing on stages around the world and the many exciting people she has befriended through the years.  In November 2008, Charlot had a one-woman show entitled "In Retrospect" in Cuernavaca, Mexico. So many expressed an interest in the Charlot clothing that spanned more than 50 years in the fashion world that in early 2009, the Izcalli Boutique in Cuernavaca presented an offering of some of the original designs that were still in Charlot's possession. The trunk show was a huge success and was accompanied by a Juli Lynne Calendar full of interesting photos from her career. She is working on her memoirs and remains active in the arts.

References

1922 births
Living people
American fashion designers
American women fashion designers
People from the Bronx
21st-century American women